Carlos Rendo (born 1964) is an American attorney and Republican Party politician from New Jersey. He is the mayor of Woodcliff Lake and was the nominee for Lieutenant Governor of New Jersey in the 2017 gubernatorial election as the running mate of former Lieutenant Governor Kim Guadagno.

Background
Rendo was born in Cuba in 1964 and immigrated to the United States in 1966. He grew up in Union City and graduated from Emerson High School. He  was registered to vote by long-time Hudson County GOP Chairman Jose Arango. He attended Rutgers University and received his J.D. degree from Temple University Law School. He has his own practice in North Bergen, Mulkay and Rendo, P.C. He has served on the New Jersey Ethnic Advisory Counsel and has also served as a trustee for New Jersey City University.
He and his wife and three children live in Woodcliff Lake.

Political career
Rendo moved to Woodclff Lake in 2000 and became council member in 2013. Rendo became the first Hispanic mayor of Woodcliff Lake after defeating Republican-turned-Democrat and fellow councilman Jeff Bader in 2015.

Rendo was the co-chair of the Marco Rubio campaign in New Jersey in the race for the Republican presidential nomination in 2016.

Rendo was the Republican candidate for Lieutenant Governor of New Jersey in the 2017 gubernatorial election as the running mate of candidate for Governor of New Jersey, Kim Guadagno, the incumbent lieutenant governor. If elected, Rendo would have been the first Latino and the first male to hold the position, which has been held by Guadagno since it was created effective with the 2009 gubernatorial election. He was the first man to be nominated for Lt. Gov. of either major party in state history.

References

1964 births
21st-century American politicians
American politicians of Cuban descent
Cuban emigrants to the United States
Hispanic and Latino American mayors in New Jersey
Hispanic and Latino American politicians
Living people
New Jersey city council members
Mayors of places in New Jersey
New Jersey lawyers
New Jersey Republicans
People from Woodcliff Lake, New Jersey
People from Sagua la Grande
Politicians from Union City, New Jersey
Rutgers University alumni
Temple University alumni
Hispanic and Latino American people in New Jersey politics